Mujibur Rahman Devdas (1929/1930 – 18 May 2020) was a Bangladeshi activist. He was awarded Ekushey Padak in 2015 by the Government of Bangladesh.

Career
Devdas served as a faculty member at the Department of Mathematics, Rajshahi University.

He died on 17 May 2020, aged 90.

References

2020 deaths
Bangladeshi activists
Recipients of the Ekushey Padak
Academic staff of the University of Rajshahi
Year of birth uncertain